Carlos Enrique Lorca Tobar (November 19, 1944 – disappeared 1975), was a Chilean physician, president of the Students' Federation and then deputy for Valdivia province and leader of the Socialist Party of Chile.

After the 1973 coup, the Socialist Party as well as the Communist Party were targeted by Chile's secret police. On June 25, 1975, Dr. Lorca, a psychiatrist teaching at the University of Chile, a former member of congress and a member of the political commission of the Socialist party central committee, and Modesta Carolina Wiff Sepulveda, 34, a social worker, were arrested at a laundromat on Calle Maule in Santiago de Chile.

At this laundromat, contacts were made and orders were passed on within the Socialist party. Wiff was functioning as a liaison with the leadership, and was also responsible for carrying out some party tasks. The DINA secret police captured him, along with other opposition leaders, and they were transferred to Villa Grimaldi detention center, from where all trace was lost. DINA agents searched Modesta Carolina Wiff's house a few hours after she was arrested. All the appeals for protection attempted in order to secure their release were in vain. Likewise the criminal process that the relatives initiated as a result of their being apprehended concluded when the criminal court declared itself incompetent and ordered that the trial proceedings be sent to the military justice system.  According to independent testimony these two people were arrested and taken to the Villa Grimaldi DINA facility. Since then there has been no further word about either of them.

External links
Truth Commissions Digital Collection: Reports: Chile PART THREE, Chapter Two  (A.2.c) 1974 through August 1977
Complete information on his captivity 
Chile 1977 Chapter II Case Nº 1958: CARLOS ENRIQUE LORCA TOBAR
Partido Socialista de Chile 

1944 births
1975 deaths
Members of the Chamber of Deputies of Chile
People killed in Operation Condor
Socialist Party of Chile politicians
Chilean psychiatrists